The 1935 GP Ouest-France was the fifth edition of the GP Ouest-France cycle race and was held on 27 August 1935. The race started and finished in Plouay. The race was won by Jean Le Dily.

General classification

References

1935
1935 in road cycling
1935 in French sport